The Urskog–Høland Line, also known as Tertitten, is a narrow gauge railway between Sørumsand and Skulerud in Norway.

History
Today part of the line is preserved as a museum at Sørumsand in Lillestrøm kommune. The railway company was headquartered at Bjørkelangen. The line was built in the least expensive way as a so-called tertiary railway with a  gauge track. This gave the line its diminutive, affectionate nickname, "Tertitten". The railway was run as a privately owned joint stock company until 1945 when it was bought by the government and run by the Norwegian State Railways (NSB) under the name Aurskog-Hølandbanen.

The basis for the railway lay mostly in forest and agriculture products. Lumber was transported to Skulerud and from there it was rafted to Halden. At one time a tour billed as "The Great Roundtrip" was a popular tourist attraction, combining the train ride with a boat ride on the steam ship "DS Turisten" which trafficked the Halden Canal.

The restoration
A cooperative consisting of volunteers was established in 1961 with the aim of securing the line for posterity. A 3-kilometer track at Sørumsand was given to the group along with two steam locomotives and some other stock. The first run as a heritage railway was undertaken in 1966. This stretch had no buildings or side tracks, and all facilities which meet the present-day visitor was built after becoming a heritage railway. Three of the steam locomotives and two passenger carriages were restored.

When the heritage railway was established the terminus was just outside the town center of Sørumsand, with the track leading to the station building already having been removed. In 1987 the line had been extended and the first train could depart from the town center again. After another two years the entire operation, including station building, was finished, and the extended track was officially inaugurated. The entire complex is protected by law. The Urskog–Høland Line is now a museum under the umbrella of Museene i Akershus (MiA) run i cooperation with "Venneforeningen Tertitten".

Locomotives

Steam

Diesel

Rolling stock

Passenger

Freight

See also 
 Narrow gauge railways in Norway

External links 
photos from Urskog-Hølandsbanen
Urskog-Høland Line Homepage

Heritage railways in Norway
Museums established in 1966
Museums in Viken
Private railway lines in Norway
Railway lines in Viken
Railway lines opened in 1896
Railway lines closed in 1961
1896 establishments in Norway
1966 establishments in Norway
750 mm gauge railways in Norway